Imam Khomieni Memorial Trust, Kargil - Ladakh is a socio-religious organisation in Kargil, Ladakh, India. It was founded in the year 1989  by a group of young volunteers. The Iranian Revolution was the basic reason for formation of the Trust. The sole aim of the trust is to keep the principles and values set by Ayatollah Khomeini alive and particularly his last will emphasizing the unity of Muslim Umah and helping the cause of oppressed and downtrodden people of the world.

Sub organisations

 Mutahhary Educational Society  
 Baqiria Health Care & Research Centre
 Zanabia Women Welfare Society (Women's Wing) 
 Basij-E-Imam (Volunteers) 
 Jamia-e-Zahra women college affiliated with Al mustafa International and Aligragh Muslim University
 Jamia-e-Imam Khomeini Boys college affiliated with Al mustafa International and Aligragh Muslim University
 Lujnat-ul-Khaira 
 Baseej-e-Rohani
 Voice Of Ladakh/ Leading Regional News Paper
 Media Cell IKMT
 Bazm-E-Adab. Poetry Wing
 ''Khawja Ghulam-us-Sayidain Library

References

Organisations based in Ladakh
Organizations established in 1979
1979 establishments in Jammu and Kashmir